Frederick Alvin Kelsey (August 20, 1884 – September 2, 1961) was an American actor, film director, and screenwriter.

Kelsey directed one- and two-reel films for Universal Film Manufacturing Company. He appeared in more than 400 films between 1911 and 1958, often playing policemen or detectives. He also directed 37 films between 1914 and 1920. Kelsey was caricatured as the detective in the 1943 MGM cartoon Who Killed Who? directed by Tex Avery. He was born in Sandusky, Ohio and died at the Motion Picture Country Home in Hollywood, California, aged 77.

Selected filmography

References

External links

1884 births
1961 deaths
20th-century American male actors
American male film actors
American male screenwriters
American male silent film actors
American male television actors
Burials at Valhalla Memorial Park Cemetery
Film directors from Ohio
Male actors from Ohio
People from Sandusky, Ohio
Screenwriters from Ohio
20th-century American male writers
20th-century American screenwriters